The Dollop is an American comedy history podcast in which comedian Dave Anthony reads stories from American history to his friend and fellow comedian Gareth Reynolds, who usually has no knowledge of the topic that will be discussed, with the two commenting on and reacting to the stories. Each episode centers on an event or person from history selected for its humor or peculiarity. Typical episodes feature stories or events that are usually, but not always, from American history; they are described by Anthony, and he and Reynolds often improvise comical scenarios.

Background
The podcast began as a way of preparing for Anthony's one-man show at the Melbourne Comedy Festival, a solo project where he would simply talk about various subjects. Unsatisfied with the initial results, he decided to change to a focus on history and invite other comedians to listen and react to the stories. Reynolds was the first guest and was initially set to be replaced with a revolving cast of comedians, but after his performance, Anthony decided to keep him on as co-host. Anthony was inspired by the book A People's History of the United States by Howard Zinn, which made him realize that the history he was taught in school was often false or littered with disinformation in order to present the U.S. in a more positive light.

Reynolds and Anthony have recorded a number of live episodes in various U.S. cities, as well as Canada and five tours of Australia. Live episodes performed outside of the U.S. have featured stories from those respective countries; for example, topics covered in Australia included the Emu War and Arthur Phillip. Live shows both inside and outside the U.S. often include additional guest comedians, including Patton Oswalt, Wil Anderson, and My Favorite Murder hosts Georgia Hardstark and Karen Kilgariff. There are sometimes episodes called "Reverse Dollops", which consist of stories selected and read by Reynolds to Anthony, such as the episode on Nim Chimpsky. There are also shorter episodes called "Smollops", which usually last less than 30 minutes.

On 5 August 2019, the first season of The Dollop: England (& the UK) was announced. The first of ten episodes was released on 15 August. A sister podcast, called El Dollop, was announced on March 16, 2020. It is a Spanish-language version of The Dollop, hosted by Eduardo Espinosa, who reads to his co-host José Antonio Badía.

Reception 
Since its initial release in 2014, The Dollop has frequently ranked in the iTunes Top 100. In 2016, The Guardian rated the podcast as one of the 50 best podcasts of 2016.

Controversy 
On July 9, 2015, Alan Bellows of the history website and podcast Damn Interesting posted an open letter accusing The Dollop of plagiarism. Following this incident, Anthony claimed that all research and writing for new episodes was done by himself and others specifically for The Dollop, with sources referenced on a separate website. However, in August 2019, Slate national editor Josh Levin alleged that a 2017 live episode of The Dollop was lifted almost entirely from Levin's reporting with no public credit. Author Paul Brown further accused The Dollop of piecing together another 2017 episode from snippets of his book The Rocketbelt Caper. Anthony posted a public apology to Levin on The Dollop subreddit, acknowledging this pattern as a personal failing and promising to do better in the future.

Book 
In 2017, the two hosts released a book called United States of Absurdity: Untold Stories from American History, featuring 29 stories that had been discussed on the podcast.

List of episodes

See also 

 List of history podcasts

References 
Notes

Further reading
 

2014 podcast debuts
Audio podcasts
Comedy and humor podcasts
History podcasts